Stefanie Birkelbach (born 2 May 1967) is a German former cross-country skier. She competed in three events at the 1988 Winter Olympics.

Cross-country skiing results

Olympic Games

World Cup

Season standings

References

External links
 

1967 births
Living people
German female cross-country skiers
Olympic cross-country skiers of West Germany
Cross-country skiers at the 1988 Winter Olympics
Sportspeople from Siegen